Justice Arachchige Achala Uthpalavarna Wengappuli is a Sri Lankan Judge and Lawyer. He is a Justice of the Supreme Court of Sri Lanka, he was a Judge of the Court of Appeal of Sri Lanka from 2018 to 2020 and a Judge of the High Court of Sri Lanka from 2007 to 2018.

Justice Wengappuli received his primary education at  Lalith Athulathmudali Vidyalaya, Mt Lavinia and completed his secondary education at Royal College, Colombo. Thereafter he entered Sri Lanka Law College and was admitted to the bar in 1990. He later gained an LL.M from the University of Colombo.

He joined the  Attorney General's Department as a State Counsel in 1993. He left the Attorney General's Department in 2007, when he was appointed a Judge of the High Court and was seconded to the judiciary of Fiji. In March 2018, he was appointed as a Justice of the Court of Appeal of Sri Lanka and in December 2020, he was appointed as a Justice of the Supreme Court of Sri Lanka.

References 

Sinhalese judges
Sinhalese lawyers
Court of Appeal of Sri Lanka judges
High Courts of Sri Lanka judges
Alumni of the University of Colombo
Alumni of Sri Lanka Law College
Alumni of Royal College, Colombo
Living people
Sri Lankan judges on the courts of Fiji
1964 births